Southwest Christian School is a private, coeducational, college-preparatory Christian school in Fort Worth, Texas, United States. It has both a lower campus and upper campus, which are approximately 2 miles away from each other.

References

Christian schools in Texas
Private K-12 schools in Texas
Private schools in Fort Worth, Texas
1969 establishments in Texas
Educational institutions established in 1969